WIOM-LP (101.7 FM, "The Lighter Side of Springfield") is a non-profit, noncommercial low-power FM radio station licensed to serve Springfield, Massachusetts. It is a broadcast service of Media Preservation Foundation, and broadcasts an adult contemporary format.

See also
List of radio stations in Massachusetts

References

External links

IOM-LP
IOM-LP
Radio stations established in 2017
Mass media in Hampden County, Massachusetts
Springfield, Massachusetts
2017 establishments in Massachusetts